Butare Airport is an airport in Butare, Rwanda.

Location
Butare Airport , is located in the city of Butare, in Huye District, Southern Province. The geographic coordinates of this airport are:2° 35' 42.00"S, 29° 44' 24.00"E (Latitude:-2.59500; Longitude:29.74000).

Overview
Butare  Airport is a small civilian airport that serves the town of Butare. It is one of the eight (8) airports that are administered by the Rwanda Civil Aviation Authority.

See also
 Butare
 Civil Aviation Authority of Rwanda
 Huye District
 Southern Province, Rwanda

References

External links 
Location of Butare Airport At Google Maps
Rwanda Civil Aviation Authority Homepage

Airports in Rwanda